Denise Mitchell (born 22 November 1976) is an Irish Sinn Féin politician who has been a Teachta Dála (TD) for the Dublin Bay North constituency since the 2016 general election.

She was a member of Dublin City Council from 2014 to 2016.

A well-known community activist locally, Mitchell is described as being close to Sinn Féin leader Mary Lou McDonald. In 2016, she listed the campaign calling to Repeal the 8th amendment as a priority for her if elected to the Dáil.

In the 2016 general election, she took the fourth of five seats in the newly-created Dublin Bay North constituency.

In the 2020 general election, she received the single highest vote of any candidate in the State, securing 21,344 first-preference votes and being elected on the first count.

Personal life
She is originally from Darndale. Mitchell joined Sinn Féin in the early 1990s. She worked in a locally-based knitwear factory, Shamrock Apparel, before also having careers with Motorola, Gateway 2000 and Brink's.

In 2014, she came to prominence as a local leader of the Right2Water movement protesting against the imposition of domestic water charges in Ireland, and during a rally in Ayrfield Community Centre she said it was important that no political party try to take over the movement.

She lives in Ayrfield, Coolock with her husband Alan and three children.

References

External links
Denise Mitchell's page on the Sinn Féin website

Living people
Alumni of Dublin Institute of Technology
Local councillors in Dublin (city)
Members of the 32nd Dáil
Members of the 33rd Dáil
21st-century women Teachtaí Dála
Politicians from County Dublin
Sinn Féin TDs (post-1923)
1976 births